The 2021–22 Super League 2, known as  Super League 2  betsson for sponsorship reasons, is the third season of the Super League 2, the second-tier Greek professional league for association football clubs, since the restructuring of the Greek football league system.

The season started on 6 November 2021 and will finish in May 2022. The league will be conducted of 34 teams and two groups, this is due to the restructure and abolishment of the Football League. The league will also see the introduction of B Teams by Olympiacos, PAOK, AEK Athens and Panathinaikos. B Teams are ineligible for promotion and relegation.

Team changes
The following teams have changed division since the 2020–21 season.

Panachaiki, Ialysos, Santorini 2020, Orfeas Xanthi, Doxa Drama, Panionios, withdrew from the championship.

From Super League Greece 2
Promoted to Super League
 Ionikos

Relegated to Gamma Ethniki
 Panachaiki
 Doxa Drama

Relegated from Super League
 AEL

Promoted from Football League
 Almopos Aridea
 Apollon Pontus
 Asteras Vlachioti
 Egaleo
 Episkopi
 Iraklis (replace Triglia)
 Kalamata
 Kallithea
 Kavala
 Niki Volos
 Olympiacos Volos
 Panserraikos
 Rodos
 Thesprotos
 Veria

Promoted from Gamma Ethniki
 Anagennisi Karditsa
 Irodotos
 Kifisia
 Zakynthos

B Teams
 Olympiacos B
 PAOK B
 AEK Athens B
 Panathinaikos B

North Group

Teams

Personnel and sponsoring

Managerial changes

League table

Results

South Group

Teams

Personnel and sponsoring

Managerial changes

League table

Results

Title and promotion play-offs

Veria and Levadiakos played a 2 game title play-off on 8 and 15 May 2022.

Top scorers

24 goals

  Giannis Pasas (Veria)

21 goals

  Giannis Loukinas (Kalamata)

20 goals

  Christos Rovas (Almopos Aridea)

17 goals

  Hicham Kanis (Panserraikos)
  Admir Bajrovic (Chania)
  Christos Giousis (AEK Athens B)
  Anthony Mounier (Kallithea)

15 goals

  Alexandros Arnarellis (Egaleo)

14 goals

  Marios Ogkmpoe (AEL)

12 goals

  Nicolás Andereggen (O.F. Ierapetra)

11 goals

  Nili (Levadiakos)
  Andreas Vasilogiannis (Chania)
  Andrews Tetteh (Kifisia)

10 goals

  Theocharis Pozatzidis (Kallithea/Irodotos)
  Apostolos Sarantidis (Thesprotos)
  Dimitrios Diamantopoulos (Xanthi)
  Georgios Koutsias (PAOK B)
  Rooney Wankewai (Karaiskakis/Apollon Pontou)
  Mathías Tomás (Iraklis)
  Alexis Messidoro (O.F. Ierapetra)

9 goals

  Donaldoni Zambou Nguemechieu (Karaiskakis)
  Nestoras Mytidis (Levadiakos)
  Panagiotis Kynigopoulos (Kallithea)

8 goals

  Petros Giakoumakis (Veria)
  Lucas Poletto (Levadiakos)
  Tyrone Conraad (Ergotelis)
  Bogdan Stamenković (Kavala)
  Wilson Chimeli (Zakynthos)
  Tharcysio (Episkopi)
  Miguel Bianconi (Anagennisi Karditsa)
  Denzel Jubitana (Iraklis)

References

External links
Official website 

2
Second level Greek football league seasons
Greece